Mahendra Prasad Nishad (born 30 November 1967) is a member of parliament for the Fatehpur (Lok Sabha Constituency) in Uttar Pradesh.

External links
 Official biographical sketch in Parliament of India website
Constituency : Fatehpur ( Uttar Pradesh )   Party          : Bahujan Samaj Party (BSP)

1967 births
People from Fatehpur, Uttar Pradesh
Living people
People from Banda, Uttar Pradesh
India MPs 2004–2009
Bahujan Samaj Party politicians from Uttar Pradesh
Lok Sabha members from Uttar Pradesh